Ravine Poisson is a second-order subdivision of Saint  Lucia with a population of 560 in Castries District of Saint Lucia.  Ravine Poisson is also the name of a village in the Ravine Poisson subdivision.  The is also a stream with the name Ravine Poisson River.

See also
List of cities in Saint Lucia
List of rivers of Saint Lucia

References
   

Towns in Saint Lucia
Castries